Aluminum was the second album from New York City band Gods Child.

Produced by Tim Palmer (who has worked with such acts as Pearl Jam, Sponge, and Mission UK), the album features a spaced-out aura, solid musicianship and soaring sonics. It is littered with damaged guitars, distressed mellotron, and raw vocals.

Aluminum was critically acclaimed, but singles "Female Elvis" and "This is the Real World?" only charted regionally. "Need" was featured in the Fox Network television series Melrose Place.

After this album, the band moved from New York City to Los Angeles and recorded their follow-up album Dream This under the new moniker Joe 90 in 1999.

Track listing

Credits and personnel
Chris Seefried – vocals, electric guitar, 12 string acoustic guitar, bass, percussion, samples
Gary DeRosa – piano, mellotron, organ, casio, synthesizer, percussion, background vocals, loops
Craig Ruda – bass

Additional personnel
Tim Palmer – producer
Tony Mangurian – drums
Mark O'Donoughue – engineer
Eric Tucker – photography
Hugo Burnham – A&R 
Mike Ainsworth – assistant engineer
Ryan Arnold – assistant engineer

Single

References 

1996 albums
Gods Child albums
Warner Records albums
Albums produced by Tim Palmer